Buttiauxella agrestis  is a bacterium from the genus of Buttiauxella which has been isolated from soil. Buttiauxella agrestis can cause surgical site infections

References

Further reading 
 
	

Enterobacteriaceae
Bacteria described in 1982